Trapani is a surname. Notable people with the surname include:

Enzo Trapani (1922–1989), Italian screenwriter, set designer, television producer/director and film director
Francesco Trapani (born 1957), Italian chief executive
Gina Trapani (born 1975), American tech blogger, web developer and writer
Joe Trapani (born 1988), American basketball player
Sal Trapani (1927–1999), American comic-book artist